Cape Vogel is a cape on the north coast of Milne Bay Province, Papua New Guinea. It lies adjacent to Ward Hunt Strait and forms the northern point of Goodenough Bay. In 1874, Captain John Moresby, commanding  named the cape after Sir Julius Vogel, the then Premier of New Zealand.

Notes

References
Scott, L. Edinburgh Review, Or Critical Journal, Volumes 143–144, 1876

Geography of Milne Bay Province
Vogel